MacDowall, Saskatchewan is an organized hamlet in Duck Lake No. 463 Saskatchewan, Canada. The hamlet is located approximately 30 km southwest of Prince Albert, Saskatchewan and is situated on the northern edge of the Nisbet Provincial Forest, adjacent to the Louis Riel Trail also known as Highway 11. It is a short distance northwest of the village of St. Louis, and just west of Red Deer Hill. MacDowall is located in the aspen parkland biome.

The hamlet was named for Day Hort MacDowall, an early territorial politician in the district during the 19th century.

Originally heavily forested, the region was settled slowly during the early twentieth century, largely by settlers from Eastern Europe and Britain.

Demographics 

Services and clubs 
MacDowall has one Lions Club service club, which came into existence in the 1970s. The Lions Club does various projects within the community; they also have an annual supper and dance known as the Harvest Ball. The Harvest Ball takes place near the end of the harvest season, usually in late October or early November.

They also have a Lioness Club that does many items in conjunction with the Lions Club.

Religion

MacDowall has one church that lies within the hamlet. The church is a part of the Anglican church and is called St. Stephen's. The church can hold approximately 100 people. The average family attendance at St. Stephen's is between 35 and 50 people on each Sunday and has 75 families on the church registry. In 2003 the outside of the church was remodeled to make the church wheelchair accessible. St. Stephen's also has a very active Sunday School and ACW.

See also

 List of communities in Saskatchewan
 Hamlets of Saskatchewan

References

External links
Map showing MacDowall's location south of Prince Albert
MacDowall Legion Cenotaph

Designated places in Saskatchewan
Duck Lake No. 463, Saskatchewan
Organized hamlets in Saskatchewan
Division No. 15, Saskatchewan